During the 2006–07 English football season, Luton Town competed in the Championship.

Season summary
A successful start to the season saw Luton fifth after thirteen games, sparking hopes that Luton could challenge for a return to the top flight. However, defender Sol Davis suffered a stroke on the team bus on the way to play Ipswich Town. The event clearly shook the Luton side, who lost 5–0 at Portman Road. Six straight losses after the match at Ipswich dragged Luton down to 20th, and by the end of February, Luton, by now a shadow of the side that had won promotion to the Championship only two years before, were hovering perilously close to the relegation zone.

Newell was sacked on 15 March 2007, and two directors, Martin King and Liam Day, resigned from the board as a result. Brian Stein lasted just one game as caretaker boss before Kevin Blackwell was announced as Luton's new manager. 11 April saw chairman Bill Tomlins resign his position following an investigation by the Football Association into irregular payments made by the Football Club's parent company, and confirm that illegal payments had been made to incoming players' agents. David Pinkney was confirmed as new chairman two days later, also acquiring a controlling interest in the club's holding company. Luton's relegation was confirmed a week later in a 1–0 defeat away to Derby County.

Kit
Diadora became Luton's new kit manufacturers after the club chose not to extend the previous deal with Xara. Electrolux became the new kit sponsors.

Final league table

Results
Luton Town's score comes first

Legend

Football League Championship

FA Cup

League Cup

Squad

Left club during season

See also
List of Luton Town F.C. seasons

References

Luton Town F.C. seasons
Luton Town